Uncas Tales Batista (born 14 October 1996) is a Brazilian rower, lightweight single sculler.

He won the gold medal at the 2017 World Under 23 Championships. From a second place in the semifinal to become champion for the second year in a row. Batista has also been competing at the elite level with Final A at the 2017 World Rowing Championships. He won the bronze medal at the  2019 Pan American Games.

References

External links

World Rowing

Living people
1996 births
Brazilian male rowers
Place of birth missing (living people)
Pan American Games medalists in rowing
Pan American Games bronze medalists for Brazil
Rowers at the 2019 Pan American Games
Medalists at the 2019 Pan American Games
Rowers at the 2014 Summer Youth Olympics